José Núñez de Cáceres y Albor (March 14, 1772 – September 11, 1846) was a Dominican politician and writer. He is known for being the leader of the independence movement against Spain in 1821 and the only president of the short-lived Republic of Spanish Haiti, which existed from December 1, 1821, to February 9, 1822. This period was known as the ephemeral independence because it quickly ended with the Unification of Hispaniola under the Haitian government. 

Before its independence, while Spain exercised a perfunctory rule over the east side of Hispaniola, Núñez de Cáceres pioneered the use of literature as a weapon for social protest and anti-colonial politics. He was also the first Dominican fabulist and one of the first criollo storytellers in Spanish America. Many of his works appeared in his own satirical newspaper, El Duende, the second newspaper created in Santo Domingo.

Early years 
José Núñez de Cáceres Albor was born on March 14, 1772, in Santo Domingo. He was the son of 2nd Lt. Francisco Núñez de Cáceres and María Albor Polanco. His mother died a few days after his birth. He had two older brothers: Pedro and Gerónimo. He was raised by his aunt María Núñez de Cáceres. Since his childhood, Núñez de Cáceres showed a great interest in education, but his father, a farmer, wanted his son to dedicate himself to working the field. Núñez de Cáceres was raised in a very poor family and he had to study using the books of his classmates. He earned some money by helping his aunt sell doves that an acquaintance hunted. In 1795, despite early obstacles, Nuñez de Cáceres finished his studies in law at age 23. He then defended notable people in court and became a professor at the University of Santo Tomás de Aquino.

Political career 
In 1799, after the transfer of the colony of Santo Domingo to France under the Treaty of Basel, the Audiencia Real (which had been located in Santo Domingo until that time) was moved to Puerto Príncipe (now Camagüey), Cuba. Nuñez and his family emigrated along with it. It was there, in August 1800, that Núñez de Cáceres was appointed to the office of Rapporteur, although he was able to continue practicing law.

Núñez de Cáceres was also a consultant for the government of Cuba. In late 1808, after Spain regained control over Santo Domingo, he returned to his homeland, where he paid tribute to the victors of the Battle of Palo Hincado with his famous song "The winners of Battle of Palo Hincado". Between June 29, 1810, and May 7, 1813, he was appointed by his former boss, Juan Sánchez Ramírez to the position of Lieutenant Governor, General Counsel and Government Service Judge Advocate General's Corps of the province of Santo Domingo. In 1812, in an attempt to improve the feeble economy of Santo Domingo, Núñez de Cáceres ordered the circulation of paper money and adopted emergency economic measures.

Núñez de Cáceres had problems with Lieutenant José Álvarez de Toledo, who had been appointed by the Spanish government as Junta alternate deputy to the Cortes of Cádiz. His revolutionary ideas, written in two confidential letters that Álvarez de Toledo had sent to Sánchez Ramírez, were denounced by Núñez de Cáceres, President of the Cortes. The Cortes decided to prosecute de Toledo, but he could not be found.

In 1812, Núñez de Caceres began to shift his views on the colonial status of the territories in Spanish America.

His ideology made him an enemy of authorities in Santo Domingo, especially of Sánchez Ramírez. After his death, Núñez de Cáceres tried to occupy a vacant position as a member of the Royal Audiencia of Quito, but the majority of members of the court rejected Nuñez's request. This drove him to lead the independence movement to turn the colony into a protectorate of Bolívar's Gran Colombia.

The struggle for independence 

Núñez de Cáceres wanted independence from Spain and asked for the annexation of his country to Gran Colombia. He had tried to separate his country from Spain through a coup in the spring of 1821, but failed due to measures taken by Col. Sebastián Kindelán y O'Regan and because the conspirators did not receive a response from Simón Bolivar in time. Despite the steps taken and denunciation of the plot, the governor still allowed Núñez de Cáceres to prosecute captain Manuel Martinez for the crime of libel.

A new Spanish governor, Pascual Real, arrived in May 1821. He not only gave credit to the whistleblowers who confirmed the veracity of the conspiracy by Núñez de Cáceres, but also soon learned the name of Núñez de Cáceres' followers. However, as Real had no troops, he devoted himself to observing the behavior of the suspects and winning the confidence of key military leaders. A group of Haitianophiles, familiar with the plans of Núñez de Cáceres and his people, explained to Haitian President Jean-Pierre Boyer the political situation of the Dominican Republic, as they wanted to annex the former colony.

On November 8, Major Andrew Amarante proclaimed the start of the annexation of the Republic in Beler. Seven days later, on November 15, the situation spread to Dajabón and Monte Cristi. On the same day came the announcement of the Constitutive Act of Independence. The act contained rules that would govern the general functions of the new government and secured the new government's determination to establish itself as a Confederate state within Gran Colombia without renouncing the sovereignty the country.

The Separatist Movement began on November 30, 1821, and the next month, on Friday December 30, troops of the battalion assaulted the fortress, enclosing the governor within its walls. At the dawn, the establishment of the Independent State of Spanish Haiti was announced. The rebels proceeded to the read the Dominican Declaration of Independence written by Núñez de Cáceres, Manuel Carvajal, Juan Vicente Moscoso, Antonio Martinez Valdés, L. Juan Nepomuceno de Arredondo, Juan Ruiz, Vicente Mancebo y Manuel Lopez de Umeres. Núñez de Cáceres established a provisional government, of which he was the President, and provided a Constitution that enshrined slavery even though it was considered unacceptable at the time.

To avoid an invasion from neighbouring Haiti, Núñez de Cáceres sent one of the most prominent members of his party, Antonio María Pineda, to Venezuela to inform Simon Bolívar of the situation. The Liberator was absent from Caracas, and neither the vice president Francisco de Paula Santander or the commanding general of the city, General José Antonio Páez, lent him their attention.

Haitian unification
Almost simultaneously to the proclamation of the Independent State of Spanish Haiti, a commission of three envoys sent by President Boyer arrived in Santo Domingo. Haitian officials had orders to report the pronouncements of Pascual Real and observe the situation in Dajabón and Monte Cristi. Aware of the political change, Colonel Fremont, the Haitian head of the commission, informed Núñez de Cáceres, the newly appointed chairman of the state, that President Boyer would support the new government.

The intention of the Haitian state was to invade the eastern part in order to enforce the unity and indivisibility on the island. Núñez de Cáceres did not find the support he sought in Colombia. On January 11, 1822, Boyer wrote a letter to Núñez de Cáceres announcing his intention to visit the eastern part of Spanish Haiti with an army, not as an invader, but as a peacemaker. Simultaneously, he warned de Cáceres that there should not be any obstacles in his path.

When Núñez de Cáceres read Boyer's message, he realized that annexation with Gran Colombia would be impossible; the majority of the Dominican social and military elite preferred to ally with Haiti. Thus, he had no other choice but to answer Boyer's military command, and he agreed for the city to be placed under the protection of Haitian occupation. Seven days later, on Saturday, January 19, Núñez de Cáceres himself lowered the Colombian flag in the capital and replaced it with the Haitian flag, and on Saturday, February 9, 1822, he presented to President Boyer the keys to the city of Santo Domingo.

In August, Núñez de Cáceres Cáceres was still in Santo Domingo, making clandestine efforts to obtain support from the authorities of Gran Colombia. Boyer learned of his activities and demanded that he be exiled, arguing that his presence on the island was an inconvenience and that, if he did not leave voluntarily, force would be used. However, Boyer granted him an annuity for life.

Later years 
In April 1823, Núñez de Cáceres emigrated with his family to Venezuela, where they settled in Maracaibo. In 1824, he began working as a printer in Caracas. Later, he founded several newspapers critical of Gran Colombia: El Constitucional Caraqueño (1824-1825), El Cometa (1824-1826) and El Cometa Extraordinario (1826-1827). In addition, the last issues of El Venezolano were also written by him (1823-1824). He also joined the movement of La Cosiata, which rebelled against Gran Colombia. On May 5, 1826, when Caracas decided to take part in the revolution of José Antonio Páez, José Núñez de Cáceres and Pedro Pablo Diaz were chosen to advise Páez. In 1827, Páez made de Cáceres his secretary and advisor. Because of de Cáceres' position in the government of Venezuela, he was able to promote the breakup of Venezuela from Gran Colombia. However, this caused him to be imprisoned in Maracaibo for a short period of time. Bolivar took de Cáceres away from Caracas and suggested that he become the president of the Superior Court of Cumaná, but de Cáceres rejected the proposition and decided to move to Mexico with his family.

José Núñez de Cáceres arrived in Mexico in April 1827. Initially, they settled in Puebla, but then changed their residence to Ciudad Victoria, in Tamaulipas. In the early years, he practiced law. In 1830, he obtained the office of prosecutor of the supreme court and in 1833 become a senator of Tamaulipas and a member of the Mexican Confederation Congress, and was recognized as a Distinguished Citizen of Tamaulipas.

He served with General Moctezuma at the Pozo de los Carmelos and endorsed his agenda. In 1834, he became treasurer of Public Finance, although he continued to serve as a lawyer.

By 1844, he had become seriously ill, and the State Government and the Departmental Board of Tamaulipas gave him a pension to alleviate his struggles. He died in Ciudad Victoria, Tamaulipas, on September 11, 1846. His remains rest in the National Pantheon of the Dominican Republic in Santo Domingo.

Literary career 
José Núñez de Cáceres also played an important role as a writer and teacher. He became a professor at the University of Santo Tomás de Aquino in 1795. On January 6, 1815, he returned to teaching at the University of Santo Domingo. Because of the efforts he made as captain-general, Nuñez was appointed as the first rector of the university, and had his portrait placed in the lecture hall, paid for by the guild.

On April 15, 1821, José Núñez de Cáceres founded the satirical and political newspaper El Duende in Santo Domingo. This was the second newspaper to be published in the Dominican Republic. El Duende was released each Sunday in the capital of the colony and ran for thirteen issues, but was cancelled on July 15 of that year. Nuñez published his first nine fables in this newspaper. He also founded the newspaper called El Relámpago (Lightning) in the same city. In Venezuela, Nuñez founded several newspapers: El Constitucional Caraqueño (The Constitutional from Caracas), La Cometa (The Comet), a newspaper that harshly attacked Simón Bolívar, and El Cometa Extraordinario. In addition, the last issues of El Venezolano were also written by him. In Venezuela, he wrote fables to supplement his participation in the forums and engagement in journalism.

He wrote twelve fables, which include: el conejo (the rabbit), la oveja y el lobo (the sheep and the wolf),  el lobo y el zorro (the wolf and the fox), la araña y el águila (the spider and the eagle) and la aveja y abejorros (the bee and bumble). These fables were signed under the pseudonym "El fabulista principiante" (The fabulist beginner). He was credited as the first Dominican fabulist and one of the first storytellers in Hispanic America.

Núñez de Cáceres was well-read. He was familiar with the classic 'fabulists' (Aesop, Phaedrus, Jean de La Fontaine, Samaniego and Tomás de Iriarte). They influenced him, especially when it came to the use of animals as characters. Of the nineteen characters who act in the eleven tales of the Creole fabulist, thirteen are found in Iriarte, twelve in Aesop and La Fontaine, nine in Phaedrus and eight in Samaniego. The mule, horse, donkey, cross, and bumble appear in two of the fables of Núñez de Cáceres, but not in fables written by the classic fabulists above.

Personal life 
At the end of the 18th century, Núñez de Cáceres married Juana de Mata Madrigal Cordero. They had six children between the years 1800 and 1816, of which three were born in Camagüey, Cuba.

After de Cáceres' death, his disciple, Simon de Portes, gave a speech at his burial:

See also 
 Haitian occupation of Santo Domingo

References

External links 
 https://web.archive.org/web/20120309042355/http://www.hoy.com.do/opiniones/2008/8/9/243013/print José Núñez de Cáceres: 187 años después (In Spanish)  (José Núñez de Cáceres: 187 years after)

1772 births
1846 deaths
19th-century rebels
19th-century Dominican Republic people
19th-century writers
People from Santo Domingo
Dominican Republic people of Spanish descent
Presidents of the Dominican Republic
History of Venezuela
Cuban politicians
Caribbean writers
Dominican Republic male writers
People of the Dominican War of Independence
Dominican Republic emigrants to Venezuela
Dominican Republic emigrants to Mexico
Dominican Republic independence activists